The Nigerian Press Council (NPC) is the statutory body that governs ethical standards in the Nigerian Press. It was established by the Nigerian Press Council Act No. 85 of 1992 (as amended in Act 60 of 1999)

Function
The Nigerian Press Council  is a Parastatal that was created to ensure ethical press standards and to maintain high professional standards for the Nigerian Press. Like most other Press Councils around the world. Part of the functions of the Nigerian Press Council revolves around ethical standards. through thorough research,proper training of  journalists, accreditation of programmes in tertiary institutions amongst others.

History 
The push towards a regulatory body to oversee the press began during the regimes of Yakubu Gowon and Ibrahim Babangida under strong opposition from professionals who advocated an independent body rather than a committee set up by government.

Roles
The Nigerian Press Council is mandated to:
Uphold ethical and professional standards in the media
Investigate complaints against the Press
Monitor activities of the press
Research on contemporary Press development 
Investigate obstacles to the flow of information 
protect the rights and privileges of journalists

Controversy 
According to a publication in The Guardian (Nigeria), The Reps tackle The Nigerian press council over alleged N8.301m contract irregularities. The House of Representatives Committee on Public Accounts has accused the Nigerian Press Council (NPC) of fraudulently spending N8.301 million for renovating its building in Abuja. At an investigative hearing, sequel to queries of the office of the Auditor-General of the Federation (AGF), the committee chairman, Hon. Kingsley Chinda, also accused the council of engaging an insurance broker for N5.118 million without due process.

The discoveries, among others, followed queries on the NPC by the Attorney-General of the Federation for the year ended December 31, 2011. The AGF had, in the complaints it forwarded to the committee, urged the parliament to investigate the N8.301 contract awarded without backing, such as letter of engagement, evidence of contract advertisement and genuineness of the contractor.

Operations
The Council board is headed by a chairman who is appointed by the President and 18 other members selected from the following body:

References

Regulation in Nigeria
Government agencies established in 1992
Mass media complaints authorities